Sławomir Chmura (born 5 November 1983) is a Polish long track speed skater who participates in international competitions.

Personal records

Career highlights

European Allround Championships
2007 – Collalbo, 21st
2008 – Kolomna, 27th
2009 – Heerenveen, 21st
National Championships
2007 – Warszawa,  2nd at 5000 m
2007 – Warszawa,  3rd at 1000 m
2007 – Warszawa,  1st at 10000 m
European Youth-23 Games
2006 – Innsbruck,  2nd at 10000 m

References

External links 
 
 Sławomir Chmura at Jakub Majerski's Speedskating Database

1983 births
Living people
Polish male speed skaters
Speed skaters at the 2010 Winter Olympics
Olympic speed skaters of Poland
Speed skaters from Warsaw
Speed skaters at the 2007 Winter Universiade
Universiade medalists in speed skating
Universiade bronze medalists for Poland
Medalists at the 2007 Winter Universiade